White Mansion may refer to:

White Mansion (Copenhagen) or Moyel House, a historic building in Denmark
White Mansion (Oakland, California), U.S., a historic house
Hugh Lawson White Mansion, historic home of former Mississippi Governor Hugh L. White, in Columbia, Mississippi, U.S.
"White Mansion", a song by Prince from Emancipation
White Mansions, a 1978 American Civil War-themed country album